Çırçır can refer to:

 Çırçır, Alaca
 Çırçır, Çankırı